The Dancing Class is an oil painting by Edgar Degas. It was painted about 1870. It was the first of Degas's "ballet pictures". The painting depicts a dancing class at the Paris Opéra. The dancer in the center is Joséphine Gaujelin (or Gozelin).

See also 
 The Ballet Class

References

External links
Impressionism: a centenary exhibition, an exhibition catalog from The Metropolitan Museum of Art (fully available online as PDF), which contains material on The Dancing Class (p. 94-98)

19th-century paintings
Paintings in the collection of the Metropolitan Museum of Art
Paintings by Edgar Degas
Dance in art
Mirrors in art